Frank David Minini (December 23, 1921 – November 12, 2005) was an American football halfback who played three seasons in the National Football League with the Chicago Bears and Pittsburgh Steelers. He was drafted by the Chicago Bears in the third round of the 1947 NFL Draft. He played college football at San Jose State University and attended Paso Robles High School in Paso Robles, California.

References

External links
Just Sports Stats

American football halfbacks
Players of American football from California
1921 births
2005 deaths
People from Paso Robles, California
Sportspeople from Southern California
San Jose State Spartans football players
Chicago Bears players
Pittsburgh Steelers players